The Phrygian alphabet is the script used in the earliest Phrygian texts.

It dates back to the 8th century BCE and was used until the fourth century BCE ("Old-Phrygian" inscriptions), after which it was replaced by the common Greek alphabet ("New-Phrygian" inscriptions, 1st to 3rd century CE). The Phrygian alphabet was derived from the Phoenician alphabet and is almost identical to the early West Greek alphabets. 

The alphabet consists of 19 letters – 5 vowels (a, e, i, o, u) and 14 consonants (b, g, d, v, z, y, k, l, m, n, p, r, s, t). A variant of the Phrygian alphabet was used in the inscriptions of the Mysian dialect. Words are often separated by spaces or by three or four vertically spaced points. It is usually written from left to right ("dextroverse"), but about one-sixth of the inscriptions was written from right to left ("sinistroverse"). In multi-line inscriptions there is usually a spelling of boustrophedon (a few dozen inscriptions).

Alphabet 
The nineteen characters of the Old-Phrygian alphabet are:

Notes

See also
Phrygian cap
Gordium
Paleo-Balkan languages
Phrygian language

External links

Alphabets
Hellenic scripts
Alphabet